Massapequa is a hamlet and census-designated place (CDP) in the Town of Oyster Bay in Nassau County, on the South Shore of Long Island, in New York, United States. It is considered the anchor community of the Greater Massapequa area. The population of the CDP was 21,685 at the time of the 2010 census. 

The Greater Massapequa area, which includes the nearby CDPs of North Massapequa and East Massapequa, as well as the Incorporated Village of Massapequa Park, has a combined population of over 75,000.

History
A 19th-century writer identified Massapequa as one of the "13 tribes of Long Island,"  but additional research has shown that they were a band of Lenape, the Algonquian-speaking people who occupied the western part of the island at the time of European encounter. The bands were identified by names of the geographic areas they occupied.

The Native Americans to the east spoke a different Algonquian language and were related to the Pequot people of Connecticut and southern New England, another in the large Algonquian languages family of tribes in coastal areas along the Atlantic Ocean. Major bands of Pequot in eastern Long Island were the Montaukett and Shinnecock. Today the Shinnecock Indian Nation has gained federal recognition and has a reservation on Long Island's South Fork.

Geography

Massapequa and nearby places with "Massapequa" in their names are sometimes collectively called "the Massapequas".

Climate 
Massapequa has a temperate climate that is very similar to other coastal areas of the Northeastern United States; it has warm, humid summers and cold winters, but the Atlantic Ocean helps bring afternoon sea breezes that temper the heat in the warmer months and limit the frequency and severity of thunderstorms. However, severe thunderstorms are not uncommon, especially when they approach the island from the mainland (Bronx, Westchester and Connecticut) in the northwest. In the wintertime, temperatures are warmer than areas further inland (especially in the night and early morning hours), often causing a snowstorm further inland to fall as rain on the island. However, measurable snowfalls every winter, and in many winters one or more intense storms called Nor'easters may occasionally produce blizzard conditions with snowfalls of 1–2 feet (30–60 cm) and near-hurricane-force winds. On average, 28" of snow falls each winter in Massapequa. Long Island temperatures also vary from west to east, with the western part of the island warmer on most occasions than the east. This is due to two factors; one because the western part is closer to the mainland and the other is the western part is more developed causing what is known as the urban heat island effect.

This climate is classified as hot-summer humid continental (Dfa) which borders upon a humid subtropical climate (Cfa) on the coast. Average monthly temperatures in the central CDP range from 31.4 °F in January to 74.3 °F in July.

On August 25, 2006, a small F0 tornado struck Massapequa.

On Monday, October 29, 2012, Hurricane Sandy devastated much of Massapequa, especially south of Merrick Road where surging flood waters rose both along the shore and along the numerous canals that run a mile inland. Schools were closed for several days and weeks.  Many residents remained without power for weeks after the storm because of downed power lines.  Hundreds of houses and buildings sustained major flood damage and had to be gutted and renovated during the ensuing year.

Demographics

As of the census of 2000, there were 22,652 people, 7,417 households, and 6,297 families residing in the CDP. The population density was 6,207.5 per square mile (2,396.2/km2). There were 7,514 housing units at an average density of 2,059.1/sq mi (794.8/km2). The racial makeup of the CDP was 97.42% White, 0.17% African American, 0.02% Native American, 1.27% Asian, 0.03% Pacific Islander, 0.37% from other races, and 0.73% from two or more races. 2.59% of the population were Hispanic or Latino of any race. Because it has large Italian and Jewish communities, the town is sometimes referred to as "matzah pizza".

There were 7,417 households, out of which 38.3% had children under the age of 18 living with them, 73.4% were married couples living together, 8.5% had a female householder with no husband present, and 15.1% were non-families. Of all households, 12.5% were made up of individuals, and 6.9% had someone living alone who was 65 years of age or older. The average household size was 3.05 and the average family size was 3.33.

In the CDP, the population was spread, with 25.6% under the age of 18, 5.9% from 18 to 24, 29.5% from 25 to 44, 24.7% from 45 to 64, and 14.3% who were 65 years of age or older. The median age was 41 years . For every 100 females, there were 94.9 males. For every 100 females age 18 and over, there were 110.0 males.

The median income for a household in the CDP was $107,181, and the median income for a family was $116,266. Males had a median income of $78,859 versus $57,016 for females. The per capita income for the CDP was $42,169. 2.9% of the population and 1.6% of families were below the poverty line.

Education

During the 1960s and the 1970s, Massapequa School District had seven elementary schools (Carman Road, East Lake, Birch Lane, Fairfield, Unqua, Hawthorn, Raymond J. Lockhart), two junior high schools (John P. McKenna and J. Lewis Ames, formerly Parkside) and two high schools, Massapequa and Alfred G. Berner.

A photography book published in late 2014—called Massapequa: A Pictorial History Through The Eyes of Baby Boomers—contains old and current pictures of all these schools and many other sites around town important to the thousands of baby boomers raised in the Pequas.

In the 1990s the Massapequa school district restructured the district by leasing Carmans Road elementary to Nassau BOCES. Hawthorn Elementary was rented to the police department in 2006 and currently serves as the Nassau County Police Academy. John P. McKenna Jr. High School was converted to an elementary school, while Alfred G. Berner became the new middle school. J. Lewis Ames Jr. High School is also no longer a middle school, but now the "Ames Campus" of Massapequa High School, which is where the ninth grade currently attends.

In 2017, the district was once again restructured, changing all elementary schools from grades K–6 to K–5. This also changed the grades at the middle school, from grades 7–8 to 6–8.

The Massapequa Union Free School District currently has:

 Six elementary schools (grades K–5)
 Birch Lane
 East Lake
 Fairfield
 Lockhart
 Unqua
 McKenna
 One middle school (grades 6–8)
 Berner Middle school (formerly Berner High School 1962–1987)
 One high school annex (grade 9)
 Ames
 One high school (grades 10–12)
Massapequa High School

Transportation 
The Massapequa station on the Long Island Rail Road's Babylon Branch is located within the hamlet.

Notable people

Sal Alosi – former New York Jets strength & conditioning coach
A.J. Applegate – adult actress
Brian Baldinger – football player
Baldwin brothers – actors
Alec Baldwin – actor
Phil Baroni – MMA fighter
Matt Bennett – actor
Peter Brennan – U.S. Secretary of Labor, died here on October 2, 1996
Joey Buttafuoco – involved in Amy Fisher scandal
Candy Darling – actress in Andy Warhol films
Roy DeMeo – reputed mobster
Neil Diamond – musician, lived in Massapequa with first wife Jaye Posner
Joe Donnelly – U.S. Senator in Indiana
Michael Dougherty – screenwriter
Stanley Drucker – long time principal clarinet NY Philharmonic
Elliot Easton – The Cars' lead guitarist
Andre Eglevsky – ballet dancer
Frank Field – weather man
Storm Field – weather man
William Gaddis – novelist
Carlo Gambino – reputed mobster
Andy Glazer – poker player
Steve Guttenberg – actor
Jessica Hahn – model
Marvin Hamlisch – composer
William Johnston – novelist
Thomas Jones (1731–1792) – historian
Christine Jorgensen – transgender pioneer
Charlie Kaufman – screenwriter and director
Sean Kenniff – physician
Brian Kilmeade – co-host of Fox and Friends
Ron Kovic – Vietnam veteran, anti-war activist, author
Brian Langtry – lacrosse player
Mark LoMonaco – pro wrestler
Dennis Michael Lynch – filmmaker
Joe Maca – soccer player, died here on July 13, 1982
 "Stuttering" John Melendez (b. 1965) American radio personality, comedian, singer, actor, television writer, announcer, and podcast host 
Sonny Milano – (born 1996) National Hockey League forward for the Washington Capitals
James Naughtin – aka Erik Rhodes, actor
Bob Nelson – comedian
Charles Nolan – fashion designer
Peggy Noonan – political speechwriter and conservative columnist
Rob O'Gara – professional ice hockey player for the New York Rangers
Maureen Ohlhausen – (Kraemer) acting chair of the Federal Trade Commission
Slim Jim Phantom – musician
Eric Reid – Miami Heat television announcer
Chris Richards – musician, Suffocation bassist
Lee Rocker – musician
Angelo Dominick Roncallo – U.S. representative
Doc Schneider – Major League Lacrosse goaltender
Jerry Seinfeld – comedian and actor
Peter Senerchia (Tazz) – pro wrestler and announcer
Matt Serra – former MMA champion
Brian Setzer – rockabilly icon, The Stray Cats
Helen Slater – actress, Supergirl
Bobby Slayton – comedian and actor
Dee Snider – lead singer, Twisted Sister
Robert Sobel – author
Casey Stern – SiriusXM radio personality
Richie Supa – Singer/Songwriter asso/Aerosmith
Buddy Tate – jazz saxophonist
Wesley Walker – former wide receiver for the New York Jets
Christie Welsh – former U.S. Women's Soccer forward
Joseph Walter – author of A Grave for Kings

References

External links 
 

Census-designated places in Nassau County, New York
Census-designated places in New York (state)
Hamlets in Nassau County, New York
Hamlets in New York (state)
Oyster Bay (town), New York
Populated coastal places in New York (state)